Lists of rulers of Egypt:
 List of pharaohs (c. 3100 BC – 30 BC)
 List of Satraps of the 27th Dynasty (525–404 BC)
 List of Satraps of the 31st Dynasty (343–332 BC)
 List of governors of Roman Egypt (30 BC – 639 AD) 
 List of rulers of Islamic Egypt (640–1517)
List of Rashidun emirs (640–658)
List of Umayyad wali (659–750)
List of Abbasid governors, First Period (750–868)
List of Tulunid emirs (868–905)
List of Abbasid governors, Second Period (905–935)
List of Ikhshidid emirs (935–969)
List of Fatimid caliphs (969–1171)
List of Ayyubid rulers (1171–1250)
List of Mamluk sultans (1250–1517)
 List of Ottoman governors of Egypt (1517–1805)
List of French governors of Egypt (1798–1801)
 List of monarchs of the Muhammad Ali dynasty (1805–1953)
 List of British colonial heads of Egypt (1798–1936)
 List of Grand Viziers of Egypt (1857–1878)
 List of presidents of Egypt (1953–present)
 List of prime ministers of Egypt (1878–present)

See also
 Lists of office-holders

 
Egypt